The 1988 demo is the first demo tape by American band Biohazard, released in 1988.

Track listing
 "Intro/Skinny Song" – 2:35
 "Master Race" – 2:58
 "Victory of Death" – 2:37
 "Howard Beach" – 4:30
 "Money for the Unemployed" – 2:27
 "Lying Coke Bitch" – 2:17
 "America" – 3:01
 "Panic Attack" – 4:07
 "Survival of the Fittest"
 "Howard Beach Reprise"
 "Outro/Skinny Song"

References

Biohazard (band) albums
1988 albums
Demo albums

it:Biohazard (album)
pl:Biohazard (album)